The 1974–75 Midland Football Combination season was the 38th in the history of Midland Football Combination, a football competition in England.

Division One

Division One featured 17 clubs which competed in the division last season along with one new club:
Cinderford Town, joined from the Gloucestershire County League

League table

References

1974–75
M